The 1999 World Short Track Speed Skating Team Championships is the 9th edition of the World Short Track Speed Skating Team Championships, which took place on 5-7 April 1999 in St. Louis, United States.

All teams were represented by four athletes at 500 m and 1000 m as well as by two athletes at 3000 m. At 500 m and 1000 m, athletes were drafted into the heats of four. At 3000 m, athletes were drafted into two heats. All athletes in each heat were from different countries. The best four team advanced for the relay competition.

Medal winners

Results

Men

Women

External links
Results
 Results book

World Short Track Speed Skating Team Championships
1999 World Short Track Speed Skating Team Championships
Sports competitions in St. Louis